Double harness may refer to:

Double Harness, 1933 movie
Double Harness, play by Edward Poor Montgomery;  see Double Harness
Double Harness, 1904 novel by Anthony Hope
Double harness, a horse harness for two horses side by side